Battle of the North or Battle of North may refer to;

 Battle of North Point
 Battle of North Walsham
 Battle of the North Cape
 Battle of the North Fork of the Red River
 Battle of the North Inch